Abraham Darby, in his lifetime called Abraham Darby the Younger, referred to for convenience as Abraham Darby II (12 May 1711 – 31 March 1763) was the second man of that name in an English Quaker family that played an important role in the early years of the Industrial Revolution.

Life
Darby was born in Coalbrookdale, Shropshire to Abraham and Mary (née Sergeant).

He followed in his father's footsteps(Abraham Darby I) in the Darby foundry business in Coalbrookdale, producing cast iron cooking pots, kettles, and other goods.  The Coalbrookdale Company also played an important role in using iron to replace the more expensive brass for cylinders for Thomas Newcomen's steam engines.

He and his partners were responsible for a very important innovation in introducing the use of coke pig iron as the feedstock for finery forges.  This formed a significant part of the output of Horsehay and Ketley Furnaces, which they built in the late 1750s.  His father's successful use of coke pig iron as foundry feedstock, and his own success in using it as forge feedstock were two of the steps towards the industrial revolution for the iron industry, but the final breakthrough that permitted the great expansion of iron production that constitutes the industrial revolution for it came later.

He died aged 51. He had married twice: firstly Margaret Smith (died 1740), with whom he had three children including Hannah who married Richard Reynolds, and secondly the Quaker minister Abiah Maude, with whom he had a further thirteen children although only four including Abraham Darby III survived.

See also
 Abraham Darby I
 Abraham Darby III
 Abraham Darby IV

References

External links
 The Darby family of inventors
 The Darby family
 The Darby dynasty
 The Darby House
 The Coalbrookdale Company, with which the family was associated
 DNB biography of Abiah Darby

1711 births
1763 deaths
People from Coalbrookdale
English ironmasters
People of the Industrial Revolution
English Quakers
18th-century Quakers
18th-century ironmasters